Moore's Dublin Edition of Encyclopædia Britannica was an Irish printing of Encyclopædia Britannica Third Edition, printed by James Moore of College Green, Dublin.

The title pages are dated the year they were printed, in volume order from 1788 to 1797, as opposed to those of Britannica, which were all dated 1797. This leads to the curious situation where the pirated version of a work has an earlier date than the original.

The number of copperplates is listed as "Near Five Hundred" while Britannica and Dobson's Encyclopaedia both say 542. Not all the plates were used. The volumes are board bound in leather and with the same high quality linen paper as Britannica. Each volume of Britannica has errata listed at the end of each, while Moore's has corrected them.

Editions of the Encyclopædia Britannica
1797 non-fiction books
1797 in Scotland
1797 in Ireland
18th-century encyclopedias
Irish encyclopedias